Iturama is a municipality with a total area of 1,401 km² in the center-west of the Brazilian state of Minas Gerais. In 2020 the population was estimated at 39,690.  It became a municipality on 27 December 1948.

Location

Iturama belongs to the micro-region of Frutal.  It is located in the region of western Minas Gerais known as Triângulo Mineiro at an elevation of 453 meters.  It is bounded in the south at the border with São Paulo state by a huge artificial lake in the river Rio Grande created by the Água Vermelha Dam. Iturama has neighboring municipalities:
West: Carneirinho
Northwest: Limeira do Oeste
North: União de Minas
Northeast: Campina Verde
East:  São Francisco de Sales
South: Arabá and Mira Estrela

Distances from other places:
Belo Horizonte: 764 km
Uberaba: 286 km
São Francisco de Sales: 51 km
Frutal: 145 km 
São Paulo: 637 km

History and culture

The name "Iturama" comes from Itu (big) and Rama (waterfall) in the language of the pre-Columbian inhabitants, the Kayapó.

Politically, in last 100 years, the Iturama region was always dominated by the rich farmers families who received by donation their lands from King Portugal time. Lands belonged from Kayapós was dominated by Portugal Empire nominated explorers and distributed to theirs affairs and partners called Bandeirantes and other kinds of foreign gangsters. They were awarded to killed more than 3 million Indigeans to dominate Brazil Area from 1522 to 1822. Iturama still today in the 21st century (2016) there is still a lot of ideas of slaving prejudice and also against black people and Indigeans. These cultures remain dominant at most part of politicians and families.
Cultures in our days are mainly related to religious expressions, but our people drink a lot beer and caipirinha during parties (including on religious ones). Theater, museums are incipient as value in Iturama. Some common music and some songs called Folia de Reis (Kings Dance, remembering Jesus Christ birth visited by a Black and Two white Kings).  
Education takes place in more than 10 Basic and High Schools, a free federal university and a private university, and more than five privates poles of distance or semi-distance higher education. The federal university (Universidede Federal do Triângulo Mineiro) learns Agronomy, Sciences for teacher graduating (Biologic Science and Chemistry). The private university graduates lawyers, managers, engineers and teachers.

Economic activities
The most important economic activities are cattle raising, commerce, and agriculture.  The GDP in 2005 was R$ R$796 million.  Iturama is in the top tier of municipalities in the state with regard to economic and social development.  As of 2007 there were 05 banking agencies in the town.  There was a well-developed retail infrastructure serving the surrounding area of cattle and agricultural lands.  There were 5,803 automobiles in all of the municipality, about one for every 5 inhabitants—a high ratio for Brazil.

Iturama is an important agricultural producer.  In the rural area there were 528 establishments occupying 77,000 hectares.  About 1,300 persons were employed in agriculture.  176 of the farms had tractors, a ratio of one in three.  There were 87,000 head of cattle in 2006, of which 30,000 head were dairy cows.  In permanent crops there were 4,000 ha. planted, while in perennial crops 3,500 ha. were planted (2006).
The crops with a planted area of more than 100 hectares were peanuts, rice, sugarcane, corn, and soybeans.

Health and education
In the health sector there were 7 public health clinics and 12 private health clinics.  There was one private hospital with 70 beds.  In the educational sector there were 14 primary schools and 05 middle school.

Municipal Human Development Index: 0.803 (2000)
State ranking: 34 out of 853 municipalities as of 2000
National ranking: 512 out of 5,138 municipalities as of 2000
Literacy rate: 88%
Life expectancy: 73 (average of males and females)

The highest ranking municipality in Minas Gerais in 2000 was Poços de Caldas with 0.841, while the lowest was Setubinha with 0.568.  Nationally the highest was São Caetano do Sul in São Paulo with 0.919, while the lowest was Setubinha.  In more recent statistics (considering 5,507 municipalities) Manari in the state of Pernambuco has the lowest rating in the country—0,467—putting it in last place.

References

See also
List of municipalities in Minas Gerais

Municipalities in Minas Gerais